The National Archives of Belize are located in Belmopan, the capital of Belize.

References

See also 
 List of national archives

Belize
Archives in Belize